The T. John College of Pharmacy is a private college run under T. John Group of Institutions, which was established in 1993. Over a period of years, the college has produced Pharmacists who are serving the profession by working in fields of Pharmacy like marketing, R&D, production, and academics.

Affiliation and accreditation 

It is affiliated to Rajiv Gandhi University of Health Sciences, approved by All India Council for Technical Education, and recognized by the Pharmacy council of India, New Delhi. The College is accredited by ISO 9001:2008, BSI,  ANAB and practices Rockefeller habits, 5S, Kaizen.

Courses offered 

 B. Pharma (4 years after PUC / 10 + 2)
 M. Pharma (Pharmaceutics) (2 years after B.Pharm)
 M. Pharma (Pharmaceutical chemistry) (2 years after B.Pharm)
 Pharm. D (6 years after PUC / 10 + 2)

Facilities

Library and Information center
The T John college of Pharmacy library subscribes to daily news papers and journals on the relevant subjects. The library keeps the previous years question papers and all dissertations. The computers in the library gives access to different Scientific Database including Sciencedirect, Helinet etc.

Labs
The analysis and chemistry lab of  T John college of Pharmacy have instruments like HPLC, FTIR, UV-vis spectrometer (single and double beam, Nephloturbidimeter etc.

The Pharmaceutics lab is equipped with a Pilot Plant, 8 station Dissolution apparatus etc.

The Pharmacology lab has Pole climbing apparatus, Analgesiometer, Actophotometer, Electroshock Convulsometer,  Histaminometer etc.

Location 

T John College of Pharmacy is located in the campus of T John Group of Institutions, which is located near the junction of Nice Road and Bannerghatta Road in Gottigere, Bangalore, Karnataka.

References

Pharmacy schools in India
Colleges in Bangalore